Phlegmariurus is a genus of lycophyte plants in the family Lycopodiaceae. The genus is recognized in the Pteridophyte Phylogeny Group classification of 2016 (PPG I), but not by some other sources, which keep it in a broadly defined Huperzia.

Taxonomy
The genus was first described in 1909 by Wilhelm Herter as the section Phlegmariurus of the genus Lycopodium. The section was elevated to a genus by Josef Ludwig Holub in 1964.

Within the family Lycopodiaceae, Phlegmariurus is placed in the subfamily Huperzioideae. A phylogenetic study in 2016, employing both molecular and morphological data, concluded that either a one-genus or a three-genus division of the subfamily produced monophyletic taxa. The authors preferred the three-genus division, recognizing Huperzia, Phlegmariurus and Phylloglossum. Their preferred hypothesis for the relationships of the three genera was:

The majority of the species formerly placed in a broadly defined Huperzia belong in Phlegmariurus. However, the genera are difficult to separate morphologically, and others have preferred the one-genus division of the subfamily.

Species
, the Checklist of Ferns and Lycophytes of the World accepted over 300 species:

Phlegmariurus acerosus (Sw.) B.Øllg.
Phlegmariurus acifolius (Rolleri) B.Øllg.
Phlegmariurus acutus (Rolleri) B.Øllg.
Phlegmariurus affinis (Trevis.) B.Øllg.
Phlegmariurus afromontanus Pic. Serm.
Phlegmariurus ambrensis (Rakotondr.) A.R.Field & Bauret
Phlegmariurus amentaceus (B.Øllg.) B.Øllg.
Phlegmariurus andinus (Rosenst.) B.Øllg.
Phlegmariurus aqualupianus (Spring) B.Øllg.
Phlegmariurus arcuatus (B.Øllg.) B.Øllg.
Phlegmariurus ascendens (Nessel) B.Øllg.
Phlegmariurus attenuatus (Spring) B.Øllg.
Phlegmariurus australis (Willd.) A.R.Field
Phlegmariurus austroecuadoricus (B.Øllg.) B.Øllg.
Phlegmariurus austrosinicus (Ching) Li Bing Zhang
Phlegmariurus axillaris (Roxb.) comb. ined., currently Huperzia axillaris (Roxb.) Rothm.
Phlegmariurus badinianus (B.Øllg. & P.G.Windisch) B.Øllg.
Phlegmariurus balansae (Herter) A.R.Field & Bostock
Phlegmariurus bampsianus (Pic. Serm.) A.R.Field & Bostock
Phlegmariurus banayanicus (Herter) A.R.Field & Bostock
Phlegmariurus beitelii (B.Øllg.) B.Øllg.
Phlegmariurus biformis (Hook.) B.Øllg.
Phlegmariurus billardierei (Spring) Trevis.
Phlegmariurus binervius (Herter) B.Øllg.
Phlegmariurus bolanicus (Rosenst.) A.R.Field & Bostock
Phlegmariurus brachiatus (Maxon) B.Øllg.
Phlegmariurus brachystachys (Baker) A.R.Field & Bostock
Phlegmariurus bradeorum (Christ) B.Øllg.
Phlegmariurus brevifolius (Hook. & Grev.) B.Øllg.
Phlegmariurus brongniartii (Spring) B.Øllg.
Phlegmariurus buesii (Herter) B.Øllg.
Phlegmariurus callitrichifolius (Mett.) B.Øllg.
Phlegmariurus campianus (B.Øllg.) B.Øllg.
Phlegmariurus cancellatus (Spring) Ching
Phlegmariurus capellae (Herter) B.Øllg.
Phlegmariurus capillaris (Sodiro) B.Øllg.
Phlegmariurus carinatus (Poir.) Ching
Phlegmariurus catacachiensis (Nessel) B.Øllg.
Phlegmariurus cavifolius (C.Chr.) A.R.Field & Bostock
Phlegmariurus chamaeleon (Herter) B.Øllg.
Phlegmariurus changii T.Y.Hsieh
Phlegmariurus chiricanus (Maxon) B.Øllg.
Phlegmariurus christii (Silveira) B.Øllg.
Phlegmariurus ciliatospiculatus B.Øllg.
Phlegmariurus ciliolatus (B.Øllg.) B.Øllg.
Phlegmariurus cleefianus (B.Øllg.) B.Øllg.
Phlegmariurus cocouyensis B.Øllg.
Phlegmariurus colanensis (B.Øllg.) B.Øllg.
Phlegmariurus columnaris (B.Øllg.) B.Øllg.
Phlegmariurus comans (Herter ex Nessel) B.Øllg.
Phlegmariurus compactus (Hook.) B.Øllg.
Phlegmariurus copelandianus (R.C.Y.Chou & Bartlett) A.R.Field
Phlegmariurus coralium (Spring) A.R.Field & Bostock
Phlegmariurus costaricensis (Herter) comb. ined., currently Huperzia costaricensis (Herter) Holub
Phlegmariurus crassus (Humb. & Bonpl. ex Willd.) B.Øllg.
Phlegmariurus creber (Alderw.) A.R.Field & Bostock
Phlegmariurus crucis-australis (Herter) B.Øllg.
Phlegmariurus cruentus (Spring) B.Øllg.
Phlegmariurus cryptomerinus (Maxim.) Satou
Phlegmariurus cuernavacensis (Underw. & F.E.Lloyd) B.Øllg.
Phlegmariurus cumingii (Nessel) B.Øllg.
Phlegmariurus cuneifolius (Hieron.) B.Øllg.
Phlegmariurus cunninghamioides (Hayata) Ching
Phlegmariurus curiosus (Herter) A.R.Field & Bostock
Phlegmariurus curvifolius (Kunze) B.Øllg.
Phlegmariurus dacrydioides (Baker) A.R.Field & Bostock
Phlegmariurus dalhousieanus (Spring) A.R.Field & Bostock
Phlegmariurus darwinianus (Herter ex Nessel) B.Øllg.
Phlegmariurus delbrueckii (Herter) A.R.Field & Bostock
Phlegmariurus deminuens (Herter) B.Øllg.
Phlegmariurus dentatus (Herter) Arana
Phlegmariurus dianae (Herter) B.Øllg.
Phlegmariurus dichaeoides (Maxon) B.Øllg.
Phlegmariurus dichotomus (Jacq.) W.H.Wagner
Phlegmariurus dielsii (Herter) A.R.Field & Bostock
Phlegmariurus divergens (Alderw.) A.R.Field & Testo
Phlegmariurus durus (Pic. Serm.) A.R.Field & Bostock
Phlegmariurus echinatus (Spring) B.Øllg.
Phlegmariurus ellenbeckii (Nessel) A.R.Field & Bostock
Phlegmariurus elmeri (Herter) A.R.Field & Bostock
Phlegmariurus engleri (Hieron. & Herter) B.Øllg.
Phlegmariurus eremorum (Rolleri) B.Øllg.
Phlegmariurus ericifolius (C.Presl) B.Øllg.
Phlegmariurus erythrocaulos (Fée) B.Øllg.
Phlegmariurus espinosanus (B.Øllg.) B.Øllg.
Phlegmariurus eversus (Poir.) B.Øllg.
Phlegmariurus fargesii (Herter) Ching
Phlegmariurus filicaulos (Copel.) A.R.Field & Testo
Phlegmariurus filiformis (Sw.) W.H.Wagner
Phlegmariurus firmus (Mett.) B.Øllg.
Phlegmariurus flagellaceus (Kuhn) A.R.Field & Bostock
Phlegmariurus flexibilis (Fée) B.Øllg.
Phlegmariurus foliaceus (Maxon) B.Øllg.
Phlegmariurus foliosus (Copel.) A.R.Field & Bostock
Phlegmariurus fontinaloides (Spring) B.Øllg.
Phlegmariurus fordii (Baker) Ching
Phlegmariurus friburgensis (Herter ex Nessel & Hoehne) B.Øllg.
Phlegmariurus funiculus (Herter) comb. ined., currently Huperzia funicula (Herter) J.P.Roux
Phlegmariurus funiformis (Cham. ex Spring) B.Øllg.
Phlegmariurus gagnepainianus (Herter) A.R.Field & Bostock
Phlegmariurus galapagensis (O.J.Hamann) B.Øllg.
Phlegmariurus giganteus (Herter) A.R.Field & Bostock
Phlegmariurus gnidioides (L. fil.) A.R.Field & Bostock
Phlegmariurus goebelii (Nessel) A.R.Field & Bostock
Phlegmariurus gracilis A.Rojas & R.Calderón
Phlegmariurus guandongensis Ching
Phlegmariurus gunturensis (Alderw.) A.R.Field & Bostock
Phlegmariurus haeckelii (Herter) A.R.Field & Testo
Phlegmariurus haitensis (Herter) comb. ined., currently Huperzia haitensis (Herter) Holub
Phlegmariurus hamiltonii (Spreng.) Á.Löve & D.Löve
Phlegmariurus harmsii (Nessel) A.R.Field & Bostock
Phlegmariurus hartwegianus (Spring) B.Øllg.
Phlegmariurus hastatus (B.Øllg.) B.Øllg.
Phlegmariurus hellwigii (Warb.) A.R.Field & Bostock
Phlegmariurus hemleri (Nessel) B.Øllg.
Phlegmariurus henryi (Baker) Ching
Phlegmariurus heterocarpos (Fée) B.Øllg.
Phlegmariurus heteroclitus (Desv. ex Poir.) B.Øllg.
Phlegmariurus hexastichus (B.Øllg. & P.G.Windisch) B.Øllg.
Phlegmariurus hildebrandtii (Herter) A.R.Field & Bauret
Phlegmariurus hippurideus (Christ) B.Øllg.
Phlegmariurus hippuris (Desv. ex Poir.) A.R.Field & Testo
Phlegmariurus hoffmannii (Maxon) B.Øllg.
Phlegmariurus hohenackeri (Herter) B.Øllg.
Phlegmariurus holstii (Hieron.) A.R.Field & Bostock
Phlegmariurus homocarpus (Herter) B.Øllg.
Phlegmariurus horizontalis (Nessel) A.R.Field & Bostock
Phlegmariurus huberi (B.Øllg.) B.Øllg.
Phlegmariurus hugoi B.Øllg.
Phlegmariurus humbertii (Nessel) A.R.Field & Bostock
Phlegmariurus humbertii-henrici (Herter) A.R.Field & Bostock
Phlegmariurus hypogaeus (B.Øllg.) B.Øllg.
Phlegmariurus hystrix (Herter) B.Øllg.
Phlegmariurus idroboi B.Øllg.
Phlegmariurus iminii Kiew
Phlegmariurus insularis (Carmich.) comb. ined., currently Huperzia insularis (Carmich.) Rothm.
Phlegmariurus intermedius (Trevis.) B.Øllg.
Phlegmariurus itambensis (B.Øllg. & P.G.Windisch) B.Øllg.
Phlegmariurus jaegeri (Herter) A.R.Field & Bostock
Phlegmariurus josesantae B.Øllg.
Phlegmariurus kajewskii (Copel.) A.R.Field & Testo
Phlegmariurus killipii (Herter) B.Øllg.
Phlegmariurus kuesteri (Nessel) B.Øllg.
Phlegmariurus lancifolius (Maxon) B.Øllg.
Phlegmariurus lauterbachii (E.Pritz. ex K.Schum. & Lauterb.) A.R.Field & Bostock
Phlegmariurus lecomteanus (Nessel) A.R.Field & Bostock
Phlegmariurus ledermannii (Herter) A.R.Field & Bostock
Phlegmariurus lehnertii Testo
Phlegmariurus lignosus (Herter) B.Øllg.
Phlegmariurus lindenii (Spring) B.Øllg.
Phlegmariurus linifolius (L.) B.Øllg.
Phlegmariurus llanganatensis (B.Øllg.) B.Øllg.
Phlegmariurus lockyeri (D.Jones & B.Gray) A.R.Field & Bostock
Phlegmariurus loefgrenianus (Silveira) B.Øllg.
Phlegmariurus longus (Copel.) A.R.Field & Bostock
Phlegmariurus loxensis (B.Øllg.) B.Øllg.
Phlegmariurus luteynii B.Øllg.
Phlegmariurus macbridei (Herter) B.Øllg.
Phlegmariurus macgregorii (Baker) A.R.Field & Bostock
Phlegmariurus macrostachys (Hook. ex Spring) N.C.Nair & S.R.Ghosh
Phlegmariurus magnusianus (Herter) A.R.Field & Testo
Phlegmariurus mandiocanus (Raddi) B.Øllg.
Phlegmariurus mannii (Hillebr.) W.H.Wagner
Phlegmariurus marsupiiformis (D.Jones & B.Gray) A.R.Field & Bostock
Phlegmariurus martii (Wawra) B.Øllg.
Phlegmariurus megastachyus (Baker) A.R.Field & Bostock
Phlegmariurus melanesicus (Brownlie) A.R.Field & Testo
Phlegmariurus merrillii (Herter) A.R.Field & Bostock
Phlegmariurus mesoamericanus (B.Øllg.) B.Øllg.
Phlegmariurus mexicanus (Herter) B.Øllg.
Phlegmariurus mildbraedii (Herter) A.R.Field & Bostock
Phlegmariurus mingcheensis Ching
Phlegmariurus minutifolius (Alderw.) A.R.Field & Bostock
Phlegmariurus mirabilis (Willd.) A.R.Field & Testo
Phlegmariurus mollicomus (Spring) B.Øllg.
Phlegmariurus monticola Kiew
Phlegmariurus mooreanus (Sander ex Baker) B.Øllg.
Phlegmariurus multifarius (Alderw.) A.R.Field & Bostock
Phlegmariurus myrsinites (Lam.) B.Øllg.
Phlegmariurus myrtifolius (G.Forst.) A.R.Field & Bostock
Phlegmariurus myrtuosus (Spring) B.Øllg.
Phlegmariurus neocaledonicus (Nessel) A.R.Field & Bostock
Phlegmariurus nesselii (Brause ex Nessel) B.Øllg.
Phlegmariurus niligaricus (Spring) A.R.Field & Bostock
Phlegmariurus nudus (Christ ex Nessel & Hoehne) B.Øllg.
Phlegmariurus nummularifolius (Blume) Ching
Phlegmariurus nutans (Brack.) W.H.Wagner
Phlegmariurus nyalamensis (Ching & S.K.Wu) H.S.Kung & L.B.Zhang
Phlegmariurus obovalifolius (Bonap.) A.R.Field & Testo
Phlegmariurus obtusifolius (P.Beauv.) A.R.Field & Bostock
Phlegmariurus ocananus (Herter) B.Øllg.
Phlegmariurus oceanianus (Herter) A.R.Field & Bostock
Phlegmariurus oellgaardii (A.Rojas) B.Øllg.
Phlegmariurus oltmannsii (Herter ex Nessel) A.R.Field & Bostock
Phlegmariurus ophioglossoides (Lam.) A.R.Field & Bostock
Phlegmariurus orizabae (Underw. & F.E.Lloyd) B.Øllg.
Phlegmariurus ovatifolius (Ching) W.M.Chu ex H.S.Kung & Li Bing Zhang
Phlegmariurus pachyphyllus (Kuhn ex Herter) A.R.Field & Testo
Phlegmariurus pachyskelos B.Øllg.
Phlegmariurus parksii (Copel.) A.R.Field & Bostock
Phlegmariurus patentissimus (Alderw.) A.R.Field & Bostock
Phlegmariurus pecten (Baker) A.R.Field & Bostock
Phlegmariurus perrierianus (Tardieu) A.R.Field & Bostock
Phlegmariurus pflanzii (Nessel) B.Øllg.
Phlegmariurus phlegmaria (L.) Holub
Phlegmariurus phlegmarioides (Gaudich.) A.R.Field & Bostock
Phlegmariurus phylicifolius (Desv. ex Poir.) B.Øllg.
Phlegmariurus phyllanthus (Hook. & Arn.) R.D.Dixit
Phlegmariurus picardae (Krug) B.Øllg.
Phlegmariurus pichianus (Tardieu) A.R.Field & Bostock
Phlegmariurus pinifolius (Trevis.) Kiew
Phlegmariurus pithyoides (Schltdl. & Cham.) B.Øllg.
Phlegmariurus pittieri (Christ) B.Øllg.
Phlegmariurus podocarpensis B.Øllg.
Phlegmariurus polycarpos (Kunze) B.Øllg.
Phlegmariurus polycladus (Sodiro) comb. ined., currently Huperzia polyclada (Sodiro) Rolleri & Deferrari
Phlegmariurus polydactylus (B.Øllg.) B.Øllg.
Phlegmariurus polylepidetorum (B.Øllg.) B.Øllg.
Phlegmariurus portoricensis (Underw. & F.E.Lloyd) comb. ined., currently Lycopodium portoricense Underw. & F.E.Lloyd
Phlegmariurus pringlei (Underw. & F.E.Lloyd) B.Øllg.
Phlegmariurus proliferus (Blume) A.R.Field & Bostock
Phlegmariurus pruinosus (Hieron. & Herter) B.Øllg.
Phlegmariurus pseudovarius (Brownlie) Rouhan & A.R.Field
Phlegmariurus pulcherrimus (Hook. & Grev.) Á. & D.Löve
Phlegmariurus pungentifolius (Silveira) B.Øllg.
Phlegmariurus quadrifariatus (Bory) B.Øllg.
Phlegmariurus recurvifolius (Rolleri) B.Øllg.
Phlegmariurus reflexus (Lam.) B.Øllg.
Phlegmariurus regnellii (Maxon) B.Øllg.
Phlegmariurus ribourtii (Herter) A.R.Field & Bostock
Phlegmariurus riobambensis (Nessel) B.Øllg.
Phlegmariurus robustus (Klotzsch) B.Øllg.
Phlegmariurus rosenstockianus (Herter) B.Øllg.
Phlegmariurus rostrifolius (Silveira) B.Øllg.
Phlegmariurus ruber (Cham. & Schltdl.) B.Øllg.
Phlegmariurus rubricus (Herter) A.R.Field & Bostock
Phlegmariurus rufescens (Hook.) B.Øllg.
Phlegmariurus rupicola (Alderw.) A.R.Field & Bostock
Phlegmariurus sagasteguianus (B.Øllg.) B.Øllg.
Phlegmariurus salvinioides (Herter) Ching
Phlegmariurus samoanus (Herter ex Nessel) A.R.Field & Bostock
Phlegmariurus sarmentosus (Spring) B.Øllg.
Phlegmariurus saururus (Lam.) B.Øllg.
Phlegmariurus scabridus (B.Øllg.) B.Øllg.
Phlegmariurus schlechteri (E.Pritz.) A.R.Field & Bostock
Phlegmariurus schlimii (Herter) B.Øllg.
Phlegmariurus schmidtchenii (Hieron.) B.Øllg.
Phlegmariurus sellifolius (B.Øllg.) B.Øllg.
Phlegmariurus sellowianus (Herter) B.Øllg.
Phlegmariurus serpentiformis (Herter) B.Øllg.
Phlegmariurus setifolius (Alderw.) A.R.Field & Bostock
Phlegmariurus shangsiensis C.Y.Yang
Phlegmariurus shingianus R.H.Jiang & X.C.Zhang
Phlegmariurus sieberianus (Spring) B.Øllg.
Phlegmariurus sieboldii (Miq.) Ching
Phlegmariurus silveirae (Herter ex Nessel & Hoehne) B.Øllg.
Phlegmariurus silverstonei B.Øllg.
Phlegmariurus sintenisii (Herter) B.Øllg.
Phlegmariurus societensis (J.W.Moore) A.R.Field
Phlegmariurus sooianus Lawalrée
Phlegmariurus sotae (Rolleri) B.Øllg.
Phlegmariurus sphagnicola B.Øllg.
Phlegmariurus squarrosus (G.Forst.) Á. & D.Löve
Phlegmariurus staudtii (Nessel) A.R.Field & Bostock
Phlegmariurus stemmermanniae A.C.Medeiros & Wagner
Phlegmariurus stephani B.Øllg.
Phlegmariurus strictus (Baker) A.R.Field & Bostock
Phlegmariurus subfalciformis (Alderw.) A.R.Field & Bostock
Phlegmariurus subtubulosus (Herter) comb. ined., currently Huperzia subtubulosa (Herter) Holub
Phlegmariurus subulatus (Desv. ex Poir.) B.Øllg.
Phlegmariurus tafaensis (Nessel) A.R.Field & C.W.Chen
Phlegmariurus talamancanus (B.Øllg.) B.Øllg.
Phlegmariurus talamauanus (Alderw.) A.R.Field & Bostock
Phlegmariurus talpiphilus (B.Øllg.) B.Øllg.
Phlegmariurus tardieuae (Herter) A.R.Field & Testo
Phlegmariurus tauri (Herter) A.R.Field & Testo
Phlegmariurus taxifolius (Sm.) Á. & D.Löve
Phlegmariurus tenuicaulis (Underw. & F.E.Lloyd) B.Øllg.
Phlegmariurus tenuis (Humb. & Bonpl. ex Willd.) B.Øllg.
Phlegmariurus terrae-guilelmii (Herter) A.R.Field & Bostock
Phlegmariurus tetragonus (Hook. & Grev.) B.Øllg.
Phlegmariurus tetrastichoides (A.R.Field & Bostock) A.R.Field & Bostock
Phlegmariurus tetrastichus (Kunze) A.R.Field & Bostock
Phlegmariurus tico A.Rojas
Phlegmariurus toppingii (Herter) A.R.Field & Bostock
Phlegmariurus tournayanus Lawalrée
Phlegmariurus transilla (Sodiro ex Baker) B.Øllg.
Phlegmariurus treitubensis (Silveira) B.Øllg.
Phlegmariurus trifoliatus (Copel.) A.R.Field & Bostock
Phlegmariurus trigonus (C.Chr.) A.R.Field & Bostock
Phlegmariurus tryonorum B.Øllg.
Phlegmariurus tubulosus (Maxon) B.Øllg.
Phlegmariurus ulixis (Herter) B.Øllg.
Phlegmariurus unguiculatus (B.Øllg.) B.Øllg.
Phlegmariurus urbanii (Herter) B.Øllg.
Phlegmariurus vanuatuensis A.R.Field
Phlegmariurus varius (R.Br.) A.R.Field & Bostock
Phlegmariurus venezuelanicus (Herter) B.Øllg.
Phlegmariurus vernicosus (Hook. & Grev.) Á. & D.Löve
Phlegmariurus villonacensis (B.Øllg.) B.Øllg.
Phlegmariurus warneckei (Herter ex Nessel) A.R.Field & Testo
Phlegmariurus watsonianus (Maxon) B.Øllg.
Phlegmariurus weberbaueri (Nessel) B.Øllg.
Phlegmariurus weddellii (Herter) B.Øllg.
Phlegmariurus wilsonii (Underw. & F.E.Lloyd) B.Øllg.
Phlegmariurus xiphophyllus (Baker) A.R.Field & Bostock
Phlegmariurus yunfengii R.H.Jiang & X.C.Zhang
Phlegmariurus yunnanensis Ching

One hybrid is known:
Phlegmariurus × koolauensis W.H.Wagner

References

 
Lycophyte genera